Raymond Percy Galton  (17 July 1930 – 5 October 2018) was an English radio and television scriptwriter, best known for the Galton and Simpson comedy writing partnership with Alan Simpson. Together they devised and wrote 1950s and 60s BBC sitcoms  including  Hancock's Half Hour (1954–1961), the first two series' of Comedy Playhouse (1961–1963), and Steptoe and Son (1962–1974).

Early life
Galton was born in Paddington, West London, and after leaving school he worked for the Transport and General Workers Union. He contracted tuberculosis aged 18 in 1948 and was admitted to Milford Sanatorium near Godalming in Surrey, where he met fellow patient Alan Simpson.

Galton and Simpson

Later career
Alan Simpson retired from scriptwriting in 1978 to concentrate on his business interests. Galton then often worked with Johnny Speight on scripts, including Spooner's Patch (1979–1982) about a corrupt police station. He also wrote scripts for sitcoms produced in Germany and Scandinavia. He co-wrote the ITV series Room at the Bottom (1986–1988) about television executives. His last sitcom was Get Well Soon in 1997 which he co-created with John Antrobus and which was based on his own experiences in a sanatorium. In October 2005, Galton and Antrobus premiered their play Steptoe and Son in Murder at Oil Drum Lane at the Theatre Royal, York. The play was set in the present day and related the events that led to Harold killing his father, and their eventual meeting thirty years later (Albert appearing as a ghost).

Honours and awards
Galton won two BAFTA awards among many others such as a British Comedy Award. 
He accepted an OBE in 2000 and he and Simpson received  a BAFTA Fellowship on 8 May 2016.

Personal life and death
Galton married Tonia Phillips in 1956, and they had three children; she died from cancer in 1995. He died on 5 October 2018. Galton's family said he died in his sleep at a family home after a long period suffering from dementia.

References

External links

1930 births
2018 deaths
English radio writers
English television writers
British television writers
BAFTA fellows
Officers of the Order of the British Empire
People from Paddington
English male writers
Deaths from dementia in England
British male television writers
English comedy writers